Boris Karloff: The Man Behind the Monster is a 2021 American documentary film about the life and career of English actor Boris Karloff, who was known for his roles in horror films. The documentary is directed by Thomas Hamilton, who also serves as a co-writer and co-executive producer with Ron MacCloskey. The film will feature interviews with such subjects as Guillermo del Toro, John Landis, Joe Dante, Christopher Plummer, Peter Bogdanovich, Ron Perlman, Leonard Maltin, Christopher Frayling, Sara Karloff, and Roger Corman, and artwork by Joe Liotta,

Boris Karloff: The Man Behind the Monster was released on September 17, 2021, to coincide with the 90th anniversary of the release of the 1931 film Frankenstein, in which Karloff portrayed Frankenstein's monster, in November 2021.

Production
Executive producer and co-writer Ron MacCloskey travelled internationally to conduct research for the documentary for over a period of 23 years. Since 2018, the production team has filmed 50 interviews in Toronto, New York, Los Angeles, and London.

A five-minute trailer for the documentary was uploaded to YouTube in September 2020.

The documentary is produced by Voltage Films. American distributor Shout! Factory and European broadcaster Arte have expressed interest in releasing the film. The film was released on September 17, 2021, to coincide with the 90th anniversary of the release of the 1931 film Frankenstein in November 2021.

References

External links
 

2021 films
Documentary films about horror
Documentary films about actors
American documentary films
2021 documentary films
2020s English-language films
2020s American films